Ek Hazaaron Mein Meri Behna Hai (transl: My sister is one in a thousand, international title: The Inseparables) is an Indian Hindi-language soap opera that aired on StarPlus during weekdays from 3 October 2011 to 13 September 2013. The series is digitally available on Disney+ Hotstar.

Plot
Two sisters, Jeevika and Manvi live in Rishikesh with their family. Jeevika is sweet, righteous and mature, and is a teacher in a neighbouring school. Her younger sister, Manvi, fresh out of college, is carefree, rebellious, childish and immature. Chandrika, their grandmother receives marriage proposal for Jeevika from Vadheras in Chandigarh. Jeevika loves Dr. Manan, but sides with Chandrika despite her feelings for Manan.

The Vadheras' sons, Viren and Virat meet Jeevika and Manvi. Viren meets Jeevika and falls for her and the two get married. After a series of incidents, Virat and Manvi bond with each other. 

Soon after, Manvi is diagnosed with cancer. But she decides not to disclose it to Jeevika or her new family. Only Virat comes to know of her sickness. Around the same time, Jeevika faces an accident during her stay at Rishikesh. Viren asks Manvi to donate her blood, but she refuses leaving Viren furious. A confused Virat takes her away from the hospital and confronts her, and breaks their friendship. She is thus forced to reveal to Virat about her condition. 

On the other hand, Viren, unaware of Manvi's illness, forbids her to meet Jeevika and leaves for Chandigarh with his unconscious wife on chartered flight. Virat supports Manvi and decides to take her to Chandigarh. Troubled, Manvi reaches Chandigarh, and the family, later, Jeevika get to know about her condition. Jeevika takes Manvi to Mumbai to further pursue treatment. Manvi successfully recovers and in the process, Virat and Manvi grow closer and are engaged. Meanwhile, Jeevika gets pregnant.

On the day of the engagement, Manvi learns that her Mumbai treatment was unsuccessful and she has two years to live. For her treatment to be successful, she needs a bone marrow donor. Jeevika's bone marrow matches with Manvi, but she is unable to donate because she is pregnant. Jeevika and Viren decide it would be right to abort their child to save Manvi's life. After all, Manvi is like Jeevika's first child. Manvi resents Jeevika's decision as she does not want her to abort her child. She goes to court to stop Jeevika with Inder fighting from her side and Viren fighting Jeevika's. Later, Jeevika lies to the family that they found another donor whose bone marrow matched with Manvi's to get the treatment done. Jeevika aborts her child and secretly donates her bone marrow to Manvi with the support of Viren.

The family later faces more obstacles; due to Viren's professional rival Jaiswal sending Swamini's son, Karan to their house. Virat and Jeevika are falsely imprisoned, but Manvi and Viren manage to prove them innocent. The sisters manage to save the Chaudharys' ancestral property from being taken away by Dabbu's greedy wife, Sweety by reforming her. Virat later moves out to prove himself as a successful singer and Manvi follows him. The sisters' estranged father, Mahesh also makes an appearance, and Manvi immediately forgives her father for his absence and helps him reconcile with the family.

Jeevika finds out that she is infertile; due to having donated her bone marrow to Manvi while she was pregnant the first time and they opt for surrogacy with the help of a woman named Vidhi. Meanwhile, Manvi is also pregnant and reunite with the family. Viren helps Vidhi get away from her abusive husband, Harshad. Vidhi conceives and later gives birth to Viren and Jeevika's child.

Jeevika names her daughter Mansi while Manvi names her daughter Jahnvi. Furthermore, it is revealed that Jeevika is pregnant. The show ends on a happy note with the whole family together.

Cast

Main
Krystle D'Souza as Jeevika Chaudhary Vadhera – Mahesh and Payal's elder daughter; Manvi's sister; Dabbu's cousin; Viren's wife; Mansi's mother (2011–2013)
Simran Natekar as Child Jeevika (2011)
Nia Sharma as Manvi Chaudhary Vadhera – Mahesh and Payal's younger daughter; Jeevika's sister; Dabbu's cousin; Virat's wife; Jhanvi's mother (2011–2013)
Reem Shaikh as Child Manvi (2011)
Karan Tacker as Viren Singh Vadhera – Varun and Vanshika's elder son; Virat's brother; Shlok and Karan's cousin; Jeevika's husband; Mansi's father (2011–2013)
Kushal Tandon as Virat Singh Vadhera - Varun and Vanshika's younger son; Viren's brother; Shlok and Karan's cousin; Manvi's husband; Jhanvi's father (2011–2013)

Recurring
Deep Dhillon as Vijay Singh Vadhera – Varun, Inder and Swamini's father; Viren, Shlok, Virat and Karan's grandfather (2011–2013)
Amardeep Jha as Daljeet Singh Vadhera – Varun, Inder and Swamini's mother; Viren, Shlok, Virat and Karan's grandmother (2011)
Hiten Tejwani as Varun Singh Vadhera – Vijay and Daljeet's elder son; Inder and Swamini's brother; Vanshika's husband; Viren and Virat's father (2011) (Dead)
Indu Verma as Vanshika Vadhera – Varun's widow; Viren and Virat's mother (2011–2013)
Seema Kapoor as Swamini Vadhera Shekhawat – Vijay and Daljeet's daughter; Varun and Inder's sister; Karan's mother (2011–2013)
Anupam Bhattacharya as Inder Singh Vadhera – Vijay and Daljeet's younger son; Varun and Swamini's brother; Kadambari's husband; Shlok's father (2011–2013)
Manasvi Vyas as Kadambari Vadhera – Inder's wife; Shlok's mother (2011–2013)
Sehban Azim as Karan Singh Shekhawat – Swamini's son; Viren, Virat and Shlok's cousin (2012–2013)
Nikunj Pandey as Shlok Singh Vadhera – Inder and Kadambari's son; Viren, Virat and Karan's cousin (2011–2013)
Tarla Joshi as Sunidhi Chaudhary – Mahesh and Madan's grandmother; Jeevika, Manvi and Dabbu's great-grandmother (2011–2013)
Anju Mahendru as Chandrika Chaudhary – Mahesh and Madan's mother; Jeevika, Manvi and Dabbu's grandmother (2011–2013)
Imran Khan as Mahesh Singh Chaudhary – Chandrika's elder son; Madan's brother; Payal's husband; Jeevika and Manvi's father (2013)
Tassnim Sheikh as Payal Chaudhary – Mahesh's wife; Jeevika and Manvi's mother (2011)
Mohit Chauhan as Madan Singh Chaudhary – Chandrika's younger son; Mahesh's brother; Pinky's husband; Dabbu's father (2011–2013)
Divyajyotee Sharma as Pinky Chaudhary – Madan's wife; Dabbu's mother (2011–2013)
Gaurav Kumar as Devender "Dabbu" Singh Chaudhary – Madan and Pinky's son; Jeevika and Manvi's cousin; Sweety's husband (2011–2013)
Lavina Tandon as Sweety Chaudhary – Dabbu's wife (2013)
Abhinav Shukla as Dr. Manan Bisht – Jeevika's crush (2011–2012)
Mihir Mishra as Dr. Rahul Mehra (2012)
Nikunj Malik as Maya Bharadwaj – Virat's ex-fiancé (2012)
Aman Verma / Abir Goswami as Rajiv Talwar – Vanshika's friend (2012)
Manasi Parekh as Mahi Chaudhary – Jeevika and Manvi's cousin (2012)
Apurva Agnihotri as Judge of the singing competition (2012)
Shilpa Saklani as Judge of singing competition (2012)
Anele Bele as a presenter at singing competition (2012)
Suzanne Bernert as Liz – Love interest of Vijay (2013)
Puneet Sachdev as Vikram Rekhi (2013)
Karan Suchak as Sambhav Malik (2013)
Kajal Pisal as Riya Malik - Sambhav's wife (2013)
Neeraj Malviya as Shashank Mehta/Harshad – Vidhi's ex-husband (2013)
Neha Gosain as Vidhi Mehta – Mansi's surrogate mother (2013)

Guests
Ragini Khanna and Jay Soni as Suhana Kashyap and Ishaan Kashyap from Sasural Genda Phool
Sanaya Irani as Khushi Singh Raizada from Iss Pyaar Ko Kya Naam Doon?
Deepika Singh as Sandhya Rathi from Diya Aur Baati Hum
Hina Khan as Akshara Singhania from Yeh Rishta Kya Kehlata Hai (2012)
Kunwar Amar (2011) from Dil Dostii Dance special performance on Bole Chudiyan
Shakti Mohan (2011) from Dil Dostii Dance special performance on Bole Chudiyan
Shantanu Maheshwari (2011) from Dil Dostii Dance special performance on Bole Chudiyan
Sneha Kapoor (2011) from Dil Dostii Dance special performance on Bole Chudiyan
Archi Pratik (2011) from Dil Dostii Dance special performance on Bole Chudiyan
Alisha Singh (2011) from Dil Dostii Dance special performance on Bole Chudiyan
Amar Gowda (2011) from Dil Dostii Dance special performance on Bole Chudiyan
Vinti Idnani (2011) from Dil Dostii Dance special performance on Bole Chudiyan
Macedon D'mello (2011) from Dil Dostii Dance special performance on Bole Chudiyan
Samentha Fernandes (2011) from Dil Dostii Dance special performance on Bole Chudiyan
Mohammad Nazim (2012) as Ahem Modi from Saath Nibhaana Saathiya
Devoleena Bhattacharjee (2012) as Gopi Modi from Saath Nibhaana Saathiya
Disha Parmar (2012) as Pankhuri Kumar from Pyaar Ka Dard Hai Meetha Meetha Pyaara Pyaara

Production

Development
Much of the show has been shot in Rishikesh, Chandigarh and Mumbai. In the earlier episodes of the show, the cast had gone to Mussoorie to shoot the show in Jaypee Residency Manor, Mussoorie but in the show it was claimed as their bungalow. The series was also dubbed into English as The Inseparables on Star Life.

Casting
The show is produced and directed by Siddharth Malohtra of Cinevistaas Limited. Krystle D'Souza was cast to play Jeevika Chaudhary along with Nia Sharma as Maanvi Chaudhary. Karan Tacker and Kushal Tandon both were finalised to play the main role. Abhinav Shukla was roped to play another important chartecter in the series. Other cast included Seema Kapoor, Anju Mahendru, Manasvi Vyas, Anupam Bhattacharya, Divyajyotee Sharma, Gaurav Kumar, Deep Dhillon and Tarla Joshi. Seema played a strict women and but later her character turned positive.

Cancellation and future
Speaking about its end, producer Siddharth Malhotra said, The channel didn't want to shut the show. Both the channel and the production house tried reasoning with the cast. But since they are unwilling to play parents on screen, we have to forcibly end the show. In Jan 2021, the show confirmed returning with a sequel.

Reception
The Indian Express rated the show two stars and said, "The show is strictly average fare. Krystal D'Souza and Nia Sharma as Jeevika and Maanvi share a sweet chemistry. The promos of the show and the title had got us excited but the bonding between the two sisters doesn't go beyond hugging each other and wiping each other's tears. We wish the scenes were written better…with a title like that we expected some more endearing, engaging stuff between the sisters."

Awards and nominations

References

External links
Ek Hazaaron Mein Meri Behna Hai Streaming on Hotstar

StarPlus original programming
2011 Indian television series debuts
2013 Indian television series endings
Television shows set in Uttarakhand
Indian television soap operas